Bezalel Bar-Kochva (born January 1, 1941) is a professor emeritus in the Department of Jewish History at Tel Aviv University.  He is a historian of the Hellenistic period, the three centuries after the conquests of Alexander the Great, and the Second Temple period of Judaism.  Bar-Kochva's research focuses on Judea, the Land of Israel, diaspora Jews, and the Seleucid Empire in that era.  Notably, he has written extensively on the military history of the Maccabean Revolt as well as Greek views on Judaism and Jewish adaptation to Greek culture during the Hellenistic era.

Biography
Bezalel Bar-Kochva was born in Tel Aviv (then part of Mandatory Palestine) in 1941.  His family were part of the Revisionist movement within Zionism, a precursor to later right-wing Zionist movements.  He received  religious schooling as a child in yeshivas, including extensive study of the Talmud.  Like most Israelis, he served a mandatory tour of duty in the IDF.  He completed a bachelor's degree at the Hebrew University of Jerusalem in the department of Jewish History and the Bible.  He studied for a master's degree, first in the Classics department at Hebrew University and then in the Department of Jewish History at Tel Aviv University, and graduated with honors. He received a doctorate in Classics at the University of Cambridge in England, where he studied from 1969–1972.  His doctoral dissertation was "The Organization and Social Structure of the Seleucid Army".  His advisor was Guy Thompson Griffith.

In 1973, Bar-Kochva was appointed a lecturer at Tel Aviv University.  In 1980 he was appointed a full professor.  Bar-Kochva retired from teaching in 2011.

Bar-Kochva is married and has two daughters.

Works
Bar-Kochva has written five books and about eighty academic journal articles, generally focusing on Second Temple period Judaism, the Hellenistic World, and how they intersected.

 
 An adaptation of Bar-Kochva's 1972 doctoral thesis.
 
 
 Originally published in Hebrew in 1980 as מלחמות החשמונאים  ("The Battles of the Hasmoneans, the Era of Judah Maccabee") before the 1989 revision and official translation.
 
 

The book The Image of the Jews in Greek Literature was cited in several lists of the best academic books of 2010.  

Bar-Kochva was a winner of the Humboldt Prize in 2013/2014 in recognition of his scholarship, after previously receiving a Humboldt Fellowship from 1980–1983.

References 

1941 births
Living people
People from Tel Aviv
Israeli historians
Israeli Jews
Hebrew University of Jerusalem alumni
Tel Aviv University alumni
Academic staff of Tel Aviv University
Alumni of the University of Cambridge
Historians of Jews and Judaism